In scattering theory, the Jost function is the Wronskian of the regular solution and the (irregular) Jost solution to the differential equation .
It was introduced by Res Jost.

Background
We are looking for solutions  to the radial Schrödinger equation in the case ,

Regular and irregular solutions

A regular solution  is one that satisfies the boundary conditions,

 

If , the solution is given as a Volterra integral equation,

 

They are given by the Volterra integral equation,

 

If , then  are linearly independent. Since they are solutions to a second order differential equation, every solution (in particular ) can be written as a linear combination of them.

Jost function definition

The Jost function is

,

where W is the Wronskian. Since  are both solutions to the same differential equation, the Wronskian is independent of r.

Applications
The Jost function can be used to construct Green's functions for

 

In fact,

 

References
 Roger G. Newton, Scattering Theory of Waves and Particles.
 D. R. Yafaev, Mathematical Scattering Theory.

Differential equations
Scattering theory
Quantum mechanics